The 1930 New Year Honours in New Zealand were appointments by King George V on the advice of the New Zealand government to various orders and honours to reward and highlight good works by New Zealanders. The awards celebrated the passing of 1929 and the beginning of 1930, and were announced on 1 January 1930.

The recipients of honours are displayed here as they were styled before their new honour.

Knight Bachelor
 The Honourable Thomas Kay Sidey  – Attorney General.

Order of Saint Michael and Saint George

Knight Grand Cross (GCMG)
 The Right Honourable Sir Joseph George Ward  – Prime Minister.

Knight Commander (KCMG)
 The Honourable Michael Myers  – Chief Justice.

Companion (CMG)
 Edward William Kane – clerk of the House of Representatives.
 Robert Parker – of Wellington; a leading member of the musical profession.

Order of the British Empire

Commander (CBE)
Civil division
 Arthur Albert Luckham – resident commissioner, Niue Island.

References

New Year Honours
1930 awards
1930 in New Zealand
New Zealand awards